Minolta XG-1 is a 35mm SLR film camera manufactured by Minolta between 1977 to 1984. It is the second model to appear in the XG series of cameras, succeeding the Minolta XG-E (1977). The Minolta XG-1 has gone through various renaming and redesign all throughout its production run.

The last version of the XG-1 is marketed as Minolta XG-1(n), featuring a new design closely similar to the top of the line, Minolta XG-M.

Versions

Minolta XG 1 
The Minolta XG 1 is basically a Minolta XG-E with less informative viewfinder and fixed film door. The range between 1/15s and 1/2s shutter speed was represented only by one LED. It also lacks the memo holder although it had a DIN/ASA conversion scale sticker on the film door. This version features the old Minolta logo.

Minolta XG-1 and XG-1(n) 
In 1982, the Minolta starts producing a similar model with slightly different name. The Minolta XG-1 resembles the original XG 1 except that it now features the new iconic Minolta "rising sun" logo on the prism cover.

The XG-1 was later replaced by the Minolta XG-1(n) where the moniker "n" stands for "new". It features the same Minolta "rising sun" logo and has a completely redesigned body with a plastic grip, resembling that of the high-end Minolta XG-M.

Unlike the XG-M, however, the XG-1(n) is still an aperture priority model with an option for manual exposure. Minolta also added a memo holder on the film door, while also retaining the DIN/ASA conversion scale sticker. The viewfinder has been upgraded with a fixed Acute Matte focusing screen.

Despite the name change, the camera is still engraved with XG-1 on the front. The Minolta XG-1(n) supports Auto Winder G, and various Minolta Auto electroflashes.

References 

Minolta SLR cameras
Minolta
SLR cameras